Meadowbank railway station is located on the North Island Main Trunk line in New Zealand. Eastern Line services of the Auckland railway network are the only services that regularly stop at the station. It has an island platform layout and can be reached by an overbridge at the corner of Purewa Road and Manapau Street where there is a carpark.

Services 
Auckland One Rail, on behalf of Auckland Transport, operates suburban services between Britomart and Manukau via Meadowbank. The basic weekday off-peak timetable is:
3 tph to Britomart
3 tph to Manukau

Bus route 782 serves Meadowbank station.

See also 
 List of Auckland railway stations

References

Rail transport in Auckland